The Octagonal Poultry House, also known as the Walter P. Taylor Octagon, is a historic octagonal farm building located in Cold Spring, in Lower Township in Cape May County, New Jersey, United States. It was built to house hens, who supposedly like to nest in corners. Eventually it became a children's playhouse. Today the broom maker works there at Historic Cold Spring Village. Historic Cold Spring Village originally used it as a storage shed, but eventually recognized its potential as a good place to learn about the art of needlework and crocheting.

On March 14, 2008. it was added to the National Register of Historic Places.

See also
 National Register of Historic Places listings in Cape May County, New Jersey
 Octagon house

References

External links
 Historic Cold Spring Village website

Lower Township, New Jersey
Agricultural buildings and structures on the National Register of Historic Places in New Jersey
Buildings and structures in Cape May County, New Jersey
Octagonal buildings in the United States
Agricultural buildings and structures on the National Register of Historic Places
National Register of Historic Places in Cape May County, New Jersey